Jarkynbaev (- Zharkynbayevo) is a village in the Issyk-Kul Region of Kyrgyzstan. It is part of the Issyk-Kul District. Its population was 2,443 in 2021.

References

Populated places in Issyk-Kul Region